Ocuiltec, also known as Tlahuica and Atzingo Matlatzinca, is a moribund language of Central Mexico closely related to Matlatzinca and Pirinda.

Ocuiltec is spoken primarily in the municipality of Ocuilan in the villages Cinco Caminos, Colonia Doctor Gustavo Baz, El Capulín, El Totoc (San José Totoc), Lomas de Teocaltzingo (Loma de Tecalzingo), Ocuilán de Artéaga, San Juan Atzingo, Santa Lucía, Santa Martha, and Santa María Nativitas. It may have been spoken in the adjacent area of Morelos, though Matlatzinca could have also existed in it.

Due to the extremely small speaking population and the unfavourable age structure, Ocuiltec is highly endangered. In the 2000 census, only 26 persons under the age of 20 were registered as speakers of Ocuiltec.

Notes

Indigenous languages of Mexico
Mesoamerican languages
Matlatzinca
Matlatzinca
Matlatzinca